"Saved." (stylized as "SAVED.") is a song recorded by Japanese singer Maaya Sakamoto, from the album Follow Me Up. It is the album's third single. It was released by FlyingDog as a double A-side single alongside the song "Be Mine!" on February 5, 2014. The song was written and composed by Shōko Suzuki. It is the ending theme to the anime series Inari, Konkon, Koi Iroha.

Chart performance
"Saved." debuted on the Oricon Singles Chart at number 7, with 15,000 copies sold in first week. The single charted on the chart for eleven weeks, selling a reported total of 25,000 copies sold.

Track listing

Credits and personnel
Personnel

 Vocals, backing vocals – Maaya Sakamoto
 Songwriting – Shōko Suzuki
 Arrangement, acoustic piano, hammond organ, celesta, tambourine, programming – Ryūji Yamamoto
 Bass – Yūji Okiyama
 Drums – Hiroshi Yabe
 Guitar – Hiroomi Shitara
 Strings – Yu Manabe Strings
 Engineering, mixing – Shojiro Watanabe
 Mastering – Hiroshi Kawasaki

Charts

References

2014 songs
2014 singles
Anime songs
Maaya Sakamoto songs
FlyingDog singles